Mun Suk (문숙, 文淑; born 10 May 1965) is a South Korean former cyclist. She competed in the women's road race event at the 1984 Summer Olympics.

References

External links
 

1965 births
Living people
South Korean female cyclists
Olympic cyclists of South Korea
Cyclists at the 1984 Summer Olympics
Place of birth missing (living people)
20th-century South Korean women
21st-century South Korean women